Daylight is the combination of all direct and indirect sunlight outdoors during the daytime, which includes:
 Sunlight, the total spectrum of the electromagnetic radiation given off by the Sun
 Diffuse sky radiation, solar radiation reaching the Earth's surface after having been scattered by molecules or suspensoids in the atmosphere

Daylight may also refer to:

Film 
 Daylight (1914 film), a silent film featuring Jean Durrell
 Daylight (1996 film), an American action film starring Sylvester Stallone
 Daylight (2013 film), a Dutch drama film

Music 
 Daylight Records, a defunct American record label
 The Daylights, an American alternative rock band 2004–2013
 Superheaven, formerly Daylight, an American alternative rock band

Albums 
 Daylight (Duncan Sheik album), 2002
 Daylight (Jimmy Ibbotson album) or the title song, 2005
 Daylight (Needtobreathe album), 2006
 Daylight (Pigpen album) or the title song, 1997
 Daylight (The Selecter album) or the title song, 2017
 Daylight, by Grace Potter, 2019
 Daylight (EP), by Aesop Rock, or the title song, 2002
 Daylight, an EP by Parmalee, 2002

Songs 
 "Daylight" (Bobby Womack song), 1976; covered by Kelly Rowland, 2008
 "Daylight" (Jimmy Barnes song), 1985
 "Daylight" (Maroon 5 song), 2012
 "Daylight" (Matt & Kim song), 2008
 "I Seek" / "Daylight", by Arashi, 2016
 "Daylight", by Asia from Alpha, 1983
 "Daylight", by Blue October from I Hope You're Happy, 2018
 "Daylight", by Coldplay from A Rush of Blood to the Head, 2002
 "Daylight", by Delerium from Poem, 2000
 "Daylight", by Disciples, 2016
 "Daylight", by Failure from Fantastic Planet, 1996
 "Daylight", by Harry Styles from Harry's House, 2022
 "Daylight", by Joji from Nectar, 2020
 "Daylight", by the JudyBats from Native Son, 1991
 "Daylight", by Oh Land from Earth Sick, 2014
 "Daylight", by Shinedown from Planet Zero, 2022
 "Daylight", by Taylor Swift from Lover, 2019
 "Daylight", by Yelawolf from Trial by Fire, 2017

Other media 
 Daylight (magazine), an American documentary photography magazine
 Daylight (video game), 2014 survival horror game for the PS4 and PC

People with the surname 
 Matt Daylight (born 1974), British rugby league footballer
 Tegan Bennett Daylight (born 1969), Australian author

Places in the United States
 Daylight, Indiana
 Daylight, Tennessee

Rail transport 
 Daylight (locomotive), Southern Pacific 4449, a steam locomotive
 Coast Daylight, a passenger train in California, US, 1922–1974
 Intercapital Daylight, a passenger train in Australia 1956–1991

See also
 Daylight Building (disambiguation)
 Daylight Limited (disambiguation)
 Daylight saving time
 Daylighting, the practice of using natural light for indoor illumination
 Daylighting (streams), the redirection of an urban stream into an above-ground channel
 Daylighting (tunnels), the removal of a tunnel's "roof" or overlying rock and soil